Jane, Lady Franklin (née Griffin; 4 December 1791 – 18 July 1875) was the second wife of the English explorer Sir John Franklin. During her husband's period as Lieutenant-Governor of Van Diemen's Land, she became known for her philanthropic work and her travels throughout south-eastern Australia. After John Franklin's disappearance in search of the Northwest Passage, she sponsored or otherwise supported several expeditions to determine his fate.

Early life
Jane was the second daughter of John Griffin, a liveryman and later governor of the Goldsmith's Company, and his wife Jane Guillemard. There was Huguenot ancestry on both sides of her family. She was born in London, where she was raised with her sisters Frances and Mary at the family house, 21 Bedford Place, just off Russell Square. She was well educated, and her father being well-to-do had her education completed by much travel on the continent. Her portrait was chalked when she was 24 by Amélie Munier-Romilly in Geneva.

Marriage to John Franklin
As a young woman, Jane was attracted to a London physician and scientist, Peter Mark Roget, best known for publishing Roget's Thesaurus. She once said he was the only man who made her swoon, but nothing ever came of the relationship.

Jane had been a friend of John Franklin's first wife, the poet Eleanor Anne Porden, who died early in 1825.  In 1828, Franklin and Jane Griffin became engaged.  They married on 5 November 1828, and in 1829 he was knighted.  During the next three years, she spent lengthy periods apart from her husband while he served in the Mediterranean.  In 1836, he was appointed lieutenant-governor of Van Diemen's Land (Tasmania), disembarking from the immigrant ship Fairlie on 6 January 1837.

Relationship with the colonies of Australia and New Zealand

Lady Franklin at once began to take an interest in the colony and did a good deal of exploring along the southern and western coast. In 1839, she became the first European woman to travel overland between Port Phillip and Sydney. In April that year, Lady Franklin visited the new settlement at Melbourne, where she received an address signed by 63 of the leading citizens which referred to her "character for kindness, benevolence and charity". With her husband, she encouraged the founding of secondary schools for both boys and girls, including Christ's College.  In 1841, she traveled to New Zealand meeting both Ernst Dieffenbach and William Colenso, who named the filmy fern Hymenophyllum frankliniae in her honour. In the same year, she visited South Australia and persuaded the governor, Colonel George Gawler, to set aside some ground overlooking Spencer Gulf for a monument to Matthew Flinders. This was set up later in the year. In 1842, she and her attendant, Christiana Stewart, were the first European women to travel overland from Hobart to Macquarie Harbour.

She had much correspondence with Elizabeth Fry about the female convicts, and did what she could to ameliorate their lot. In 1841, the convict ship Rajah arrived loaded with convict women who had been supplied with sewing materials organised by Lydia Irving of Fry's convict ship committee. The quilt is now one of the most treasured textiles in Australia. She was accused of using undue influence with her husband in his official acts but there is no evidence of this. When Franklin was recalled at the end of 1843, they went first to Melbourne by the schooner Flying Fish and then to England by way of New Zealand on board, coincidentally, the barque Rajah.

In 1842, she commissioned a classical temple, and named it Ancanthe, Ancient Greek for "blooming valley". She intended the building to serve as a museum for Hobart, and left  in trust to ensure the continuance of what she hoped would become the focus of the colony's cultural aspirations.  A century of apathy followed, with the museum used as an apple shed among other functions; but in 1949 it was made the home of The Art Society of Tasmania, who rescued the building. It is now known as the Lady Franklin Gallery.

Following the disappearance of her husband

Her husband started on his last voyage in May 1845, and when it was realized that he must have come to disaster, Lady Franklin devoted herself for many years to trying to ascertain his fate. Until shortly before her own death, Lady Franklin travelled extensively, generally accompanied by her husband's niece Sophia Cracroft, who remained her secretary and companion until her death. Lady Franklin travelled to Out Stack in the Shetland Islands of Scotland, the northernmost of the British isles, to get as close as she could to her missing husband.

Lady Franklin sponsored seven expeditions to find her husband or his records (two of the expeditions failed to reach the Arctic):
 1850 Prince Albert under Charles Codrington Forsyth and William Parker Snow
 1851 Prince Albert under William Kennedy and Joseph René Bellot,
 1852 Isabel (one under Donald Beatson aborted, the other under Edward Inglefield explored Greenland)
 1853 Isabel (William Kennedy and Robert Grate, aborted)
 1857 Fox under Francis Leopold McClintock, and
 1875 Pandora under Allen Young
By means of sponsorship, use of influence, and offers of sizeable rewards for information about him, she instigated or supported many other searches. Her efforts made the expedition's fate one of the most vexed questions of the decade. Ultimately, in 1859, Francis McClintock found evidence that Sir John had died twelve years previously, in 1847. Prior accounts had suggested that, in the end, the expedition had turned to cannibalism to survive, but Lady Franklin refused to believe these stories and poured scorn on explorer John Rae, who had in fact been the first person to return with definite news of her husband's fate.

The popularity of the Franklins in the Australian colonies was such that when it was learned in 1852 that Lady Franklin was organising an expedition in search of her husband using the auxiliary steamship Isabel, subscriptions were taken up, and those in Van Diemens Land alone totalled £1671/13/4.

Although McClintock had found conclusive evidence that Sir John Franklin and his fellow expeditioners were dead, Lady Franklin remained convinced that their written records might remain buried in a cache in the Arctic. She provided moral and some financial support for multiple later expeditions that planned to seek the records, including those of William Parker Snow  and Charles Francis Hall in the 1860s.

Finally, in 1874, she joined forces with Allen Young to purchase and fit out the former steam gunboat HMS Pandora to undertake another expedition to the region around Prince of Wales Island.  The expedition left London in June 1875 and returned in December, unsuccessful, as ice prevented her from passing west of the Franklin Strait.

Lady Franklin died in the interim, on 18 July 1875.  At her funeral on 29 July, the pall-bearers included Captains McClintock, Collinson and Ommanney, R.N., while many other "Old Arctics" engaged in the Franklin searches were also in attendance. She was interred at Kensal Green Cemetery in the vault, and commemorated on a marble cross dedicated to her niece Sophia Cracroft.

Legacy

Lady Franklin was a woman of unusual character and personality. Her determined efforts, in connection with which she spent a great deal of her own money to discover the fate of her husband, added much to the world's knowledge of the arctic regions. It was said: 'What the nation would not do, a woman did'. In addition, as one of the earliest women in Tasmania who had had the full benefit of education and cultural surroundings, she was both an example and a force, and set a new standard in ways of living to the more prosperous settlers who had passed the stage of merely struggling for a living.
Natural features named after her include Lady Franklin Bay, on Ellesmere Island in Nunavut; Lady Franklin Rock, an island in the Fraser River near Yale, British Columbia, named at the end of her visit there during the Fraser Canyon Gold Rush; Lady Franklin Rock, near Vernal Fall in Yosemite National Park in California; and Mount Lady Jane Franklin, a hill near Barnawartha in Northern Victoria, which she climbed on her trip from Port Phillip to Sydney in 1839.  Beside Victoria's Mount Franklin is a scoria mound known as Lady Franklin.

Jane Franklin Hall, a residential college in Hobart, Tasmania, is named in her honour, as is the Lady Franklin Gallery in Lenah Valley, Tasmania. The ballad "Lady Franklin's Lament" commemorated her search for her lost husband. The sailing vessel; Jane Franklin, an Amel Super Maramu ketch, also bears her name. Lady Jane Franklin Drive in Spilsby, Lincolnshire, Sir John's birthplace, is named after her.

Most of Lady Franklin's surviving papers are held by the Scott Polar Research Institute.

In popular culture 
Jules Verne's novel Mistress Branican, published in 1891, was strongly inspired by Jane Franklin's life. When John Branican, on board the Franklin, disappears at sea in Oceania, his wife Dolly Branican cannot believe that he is dead. Three expeditions are organized, and she is herself part of the third, which leads her to the depths of the Australian Great Sandy Desert. Dolly Branican is overtly compared with Jane Franklin in the novel.

Jane Franklin appears as a character in the 2018 television series The Terror, where she is portrayed by Greta Scacchi.

Lady Jane Franklin is also a pivotal figure in three novels, Wanting by Richard Flanagan (2008), The Arctic Fury by Greer Macallister (2020), and The Exiles by Christina Baker Kline (2020).

Awards and honors
 Founder's gold medal, the Royal Geographical Society

The biography The Ambitions of Jane Franklin: Victorian Lady Adventurer by Tasmanian historian Alison Alexander won the 2014 National Biography Award.

See also
Lady Franklin's Revenge by Ken McGoogan, a history of explorations of the Arctic funded by Lady Franklin

References

Further reading
 Biography at the Dictionary of Canadian Biography Online
 Frances J. Woodward, "Franklin, Jane (1791 - 1875)", Australian Dictionary of Biography, Volume 1, Melbourne University Press, 1966, pp 411–412.
 Roderic Owen, The Fate of Franklin: The Life and Mysterious Death of the Most Heroic of Arctic Explorers, Hutchinson Group (Australia) Pty. Ltd., Richmond South, Victoria, 1978.
 Ken McGoogan. Lady Franklin's Revenge: A True Story of Ambition, Obsession and the Remaking of Arctic History. Toronto, HarperCollins. 2005
 Journals, correspondence and papers of Jane, Lady Franklin at the Scott Polar Research Institute.
 Portrait of Lady Franklin, 1816 by Amelie Romilly.
 Lady Jane Franklin from a sketch by T. Bock, Hobart Town, about 1840.
 The text of Lady Franklin's Lament.
  Franklin, Tasmania was founded by, and named after, her.
Lady Franklin's Revenge, by Ken McGoogan
 as affecting the fate of my absent husband, edited by Erika Behrisch Elce

External links

Bits of Travel at Home, Helen Hunt Jackson, 1878
 Lady Jane Franklin National Library of Australia, Newspaper Digitisation Project.
 Lady Jane Franklin Correspondence at Dartmouth College Library

1791 births
1875 deaths
Settlers of Tasmania
Women of the Victorian era
Female explorers
Franklin's lost expedition
People from Bloomsbury
English explorers
Burials at Kensal Green Cemetery
18th-century Australian women
19th-century Australian women
American Geographical Society
Wives of knights